The Ambassador of the United Kingdom to Nepal is the United Kingdom's chief diplomatic representative in Nepal, and head of the UK's diplomatic mission. 

The present official title is His Britannic Majesty's Ambassador to the Federal Democratic Republic of Nepal.

List of Heads of Mission

Envoy
1924–1929: Hugh Wilkinson
1929–1934: Clendon Daukes

Envoy Extraordinary and Minister Plenipotentiary
1934–1935: Clendon Daukes
1935–1938: Frederick Bailey
1938–1944: Sir Geoffrey Betham
1944–1947: Sir George Falconer

Ambassador
1947–1951: Sir George Falconer
1951–1955: Christopher Summerhayes
1955–1957: Richard Tollinton
1957–1962: Sir Leonard Scopes
1962–1963: Guy Clarke
1964–1965: Antony Duff
1966–1970: Arthur Kellas
1970–1974: Terence O'Brien MC CMG
1974–1977: Michael Scott
1977–1983: John Denson
1983–1986: Sir Anthony Hurrell
1987–1990: Richard Burges Watson
1990–1995: Timothy George
1995–1999: Barney Smith
1999–2002: Ronald Nash
2002–2006: Keith Bloomfield
2006–2010: Andrew Hall
2010–2013: John Tucknott
2013–2015: Andrew Sparkes
2015: John Rankin
2015–2019: Richard Morris

2019–present: Nicola Pollitt

See also
List of British Resident Ministers in Nepal
Nepal–Britain Treaty of 1923

References

External links
UK and Nepal, gov.uk

Nepal
 
United Kingdom